1-Methylimidazole or N-methylimidazole is an aromatic heterocyclic organic compound with the formula CH3C3H3N2. It is a colourless liquid that is used as a specialty solvent, a base, and as a precursor to some ionic liquids.  It is a fundamental nitrogen heterocycle and as such mimics for various nucleoside bases as well as histidine and histamine.

Basicity
With the N-methyl group, this particular derivative of imidazole cannot tautomerize.  It is slightly more basic than imidazole, as indicated by the pKa's of the conjugate acids of 7.0 and 7.4. Methylation also provides a significantly lower melting point, which makes 1-methylimidazole a useful solvent.

Synthesis
1-Methylimidazole is prepared mainly by two routes industrially.  The main one is acid-catalysed methylation of imidazole by methanol. The second method involves the Radziszewski reaction from glyoxal, formaldehyde, and a mixture of ammonia and methylamine.

(CHO)2  +  CH2O  +  CH3NH2  +  NH3   →   H2C2N(NCH3)CH  +  3 H2O

The compound can be synthesized on a laboratory scale by methylation of imidazole at the pyridine-like nitrogen and subsequent deprotonation. Similarly, 1-methylimidazole may be synthesized by first deprotonating imidazole to form a sodium salt followed by methylation. 
H2C2N(NH)CH + CH3I → [H2C2(NH)(NCH3)CH]I 
[H2C2(NH)(NCH3)CH]I + NaOH → H2C2N(NCH3)CH + H2O + NaI

Applications
In the research laboratory, 1-methylimidazole and related derivatives have been used as mimic aspects of diverse imidazole-based biomolecules.

1-Methylimidazole is also the precursor for the synthesis of the methylimidazole monomer of pyrrole-imidazole polyamides. These polymers can selectively bind specific sequences of double-stranded DNA by intercalating in a sequence dependent manner.

Ionic liquid precursor
1-Methylimidazole alkylates to form dialkyl imidazolium salts. Depending on the alkylating agent and the counteranion, various ionic liquids result, e.g. 1-butyl-3-methylimidazolium hexafluorophosphate ("BMIMPF6"):
 

BASF has used 1-methylimidazole as a means to remove acid during their industrial-scale production of diethoxyphenylphosphine. In this biphasic acid scavenging using ionic liquids (BASIL) process, 1-methylimidazole reacts with HCl to produce 1-methylimidazolium hydrochloride, which spontaneously separates as a separate liquid phase under the reaction conditions.

2 MeC3N2H3 + C6H5PCl2 + 2 C2H5OH → 2 [MeC3N2H4]Cl + C6H5P(OC2H5)2
Like other imidazoles, 2-methylimidazole undergoes alkylation to give PREPARATION OF 1-BUTYL-3-METHYL IMIDAZOLIUM-BASED ROOM TEMPERATURE IONIC LIQUIDS

Donor properties
1-methylimidazole (NMIz) as a ligand forms octahedral ions M(NMIz)62+with M = Fe, Co, Ni, and a  square-planar ion Cu(NMIz)42+.   
1-methylimidazole forms adducts with Lewis acids such as molybdenum perfluorobutyrate and [Rh(CO)2Cl]2. The donor properties of 1-methylimidazole have been analyzed by the ECW model yielding EB= 1.16 and CB= 4.92.

See also
 4-Methylimidazole

References

Imidazoles
Solvents